Priyanka Singh is an Indian playback singer and performer who is mainly active in Bhojpuri and Hindi cinema. She made her singing debut on the reality show Sur Sangram Season - 1, broadcast on Mahua Channel. She has sung more than two thousand songs in Bhojpuri, Hindi and Assamese.

Early life 
Priyanka Singh won several musical competitions before her television debut at 19.

Career
Singh started her YouTube channel, named Priyanka Singh Official. 

In 2016, she sung "Chalakata Humaro Jawaniya ye Raja" with singer and actor Pawan Singh.

Singh works with Bollywood music directors and film-makers.

Recognition

In 2019 and 2020, she performed in Mainpaat Mahotsav of Chhattisgarh.

References

Living people
Bhojpuri musicians
Singers from Bihar
Bhojpuri-language singers
Bhojpuri playback singers
Bollywood playback singers
Hindi-language singers
Assamese-language singers
Indian women playback singers
Indian film actresses
Actresses in Bhojpuri cinema
Indian women folk singers
Indian folk singers
Indian women classical singers
21st-century Indian women singers
21st-century Indian singers
1990 births